Yodgoroy Mirzaeva (born 22 April 1996) is an Uzbekistani female boxer.

She competed at the 2016 Summer Olympics in Rio de Janeiro, in the women's flyweight.

References

External links
 

1996 births
Living people
People from Samarqand Region
Uzbekistani women boxers
Olympic boxers of Uzbekistan
Boxers at the 2016 Summer Olympics
Boxers at the 2018 Asian Games
Asian Games competitors for Uzbekistan
Flyweight boxers
20th-century Uzbekistani women
21st-century Uzbekistani women